The 2018 Grand Prix Laguna Porec was the 4th edition of the GP Laguna road cycling one day race. It was part of UCI Europe Tour in category 1.2.

Teams
Twenty teams were invited to take part in the race. All of them were UCI Continental teams.

Result

References

GP Laguna
2018 UCI Europe Tour
2018 in Croatian sport